Dyraspis is no longer accepted as a genus. It has become a synonym of the subgenus  of sea snails, marine gastropod mollusks  Conus (Virroconus) Iredale, 1930 represented as Conus Linnaeus, 1758 in the family Conidae, the cone snails and their allies.

Species list
This list of species is based on the information in the World Register of Marine Species (WoRMS) list. Species within the genus Dyraspis include:
 Dyraspis dorreensis (Péron, 1807) is a synonym of  Conus dorreensis Péron, 1807

References

Further reading 
 Kohn A. A. (1992). Chronological Taxonomy of Conus, 1758-1840". Smithsonian Institution Press, Washington and London.
 Monteiro A. (ed.) (2007). The Cone Collector 1: 1-28.
 Berschauer D. (2010). Technology and the Fall of the Mono-Generic Family The Cone Collector 15: pp. 51-54
 Puillandre N., Meyer C.P., Bouchet P., and Olivera B.M. (2011), Genetic divergence and geographical variation in the deep-water Conus orbignyi complex (Mollusca: Conoidea)'', Zoologica Scripta 40(4) 350-363.

External links
 To World Register of Marine Species
  Gastropods.com: Conidae setting forth the genera recognized therein.

Conidae